Alain Jean Giresse (born 2 August 1952) is a French football coach and former player who is the current manager of the Kosovo national team. He was French Player of the Year in 1982, 1983 and 1987. Nominally an attacking midfielder or central midfielder, Giresse was an intelligent playmaker who possessed fine agility and acceleration due to his short frame. He is the father of Thibault Giresse, also a football player.

International career
Giresse played for the France national team in the 1982 FIFA World Cup (fourth place) and the 1986 FIFA World Cup (third place). He was a member of the Euro 84 winning team, and alongside Michel Platini, Luis Fernández and Jean Tigana, forming the team's legendary "Carré Magique" (Magic Square) in midfield.

Coaching career

Other national teams

He has been in charge of Toulouse and the Georgian national team, among others. Giresse worked as the head coach of the Gabon national football team, and was named a few months after the 2010 African Cup of Nations the Mali national football team manager. He was the coach of Senegal national football team from 2013 to January 2015.

On 7 September 2017, Giresse resigned as manager of the Mali national football team.

In December 2017 he was linked with the vacant Benin national team manager's job. In April 2018 he was one of 77 applicants for the vacant Cameroon national team job.

On 13 December 2018, Giresse became the manager of the Tunisia. He left the role in August 2019.

Kosovo
On 23 February 2022, Kosovo appointed Giresse after agreeing to a contract until November 2023, this happened after the former coach Bernard Challandes decided to resign after weak results in October 2021. On 18 March 2022, Giresse made his first squad announcement with Kosovo for the friendly matches against Burkina Faso and Switzerland. He called-up Emir Sahiti for the first time in the squad.

Career statistics

Club
Source:

International
Source:

Managerial statistics

Honours

Player
Bordeaux
French Division 1: 1983–84, 1984–85
Coupe de France: 1985–86

France
UEFA European Championship: 1984
Artemio Franchi Trophy: 1985
FIFA World Cup Third place: 1986

Individual
UEFA European Championship Team of the Tournament: 1984
Onze d'Argent: 1982
Ballon d'Or – Runner-up: 1982
French Player of the Year: 1982, 1983, 1987 
7th French Player of the Century

Manager
Paris Saint-Germain
Trophée des Champions: 1998

FAR Rabat
Coupe du Trône: 2003

Mali
Africa Cup of Nations Third place: 2012

Orders
Chevalier of the Légion d'honneur: 2006

References

 French Football Federation profile

External links

 
 
at francefootball.fr
Alain Giresse Interview

1952 births
Living people
Sportspeople from Gironde
French footballers
France international footballers
French football managers
Association football midfielders
1982 FIFA World Cup players
UEFA Euro 1984 players
1986 FIFA World Cup players
UEFA European Championship-winning players
Georgia national football team managers
Gabon national football team managers
Mali national football team managers
Senegal national football team managers
Olympique de Marseille players
FC Girondins de Bordeaux players
Ligue 1 players
Toulouse FC managers
Paris Saint-Germain F.C. managers
AS FAR (football) managers
Ligue 1 managers
2010 Africa Cup of Nations managers
2012 Africa Cup of Nations managers
2015 Africa Cup of Nations managers
2017 Africa Cup of Nations managers
Expatriate football managers in Georgia (country)
Chevaliers of the Légion d'honneur
2019 Africa Cup of Nations managers
Outfield association footballers who played in goal
Footballers from Nouvelle-Aquitaine
French expatriate football managers
Expatriate football managers in Kosovo
Expatriate football managers in Mali
Expatriate football managers in Tunisia
Expatriate football managers in Senegal
Expatriate football managers in Gabon
French expatriate sportspeople in Mali
French expatriate sportspeople in Senegal
French expatriate sportspeople in Kosovo
French expatriate sportspeople in Gabon
French expatriate sportspeople in Morocco
French expatriate sportspeople in Tunisia
Expatriate football managers in Morocco
French expatriate sportspeople in Georgia (country)